Radio Sputnik is the audio element of the Russian government-owned Sputnik multimedia news service.

Radio Sputnik may also refer to:
Radio Sputnik (Finland) – a Russian language radio station based in Finland.
Sputnik (radio station) – German pop and rock station aimed at youth.

See also

 Sputnik (disambiguation)
 Radio (disambiguation)